The U Sports men's soccer championship is a Canadian university soccer tournament which involves the champions from each of Canada's four regional sports conferences. The championship features eight teams in single-elimination matches to determine a national champion. The championship hosts 11 games over four days at a predetermined host venue. The host team is automatically qualified for the tournament, as is each of the conference champions, with additional berths awarded for the remaining spots. The Sam Davidson Memorial Trophy is awarded to the winners. The UBC Thunderbirds have won the most championships with 13.

The 2020 championship tournament was cancelled due to the COVID-19 pandemic.

Champions

Honours

U Sports Championship MVP 
The selection is made by a committee established by the host of the U Sports championship.
2021 Guy-Frank Essomé Penda Montreal
2019 Félix Clapin-Girard UQTR
2018 Frédéric Lajoie-Gravelle Montreal
2017 Cory Bent CBU
2016 Noah Cunningham Alberta
2015 Michael Cox York
2014 Henry Moody York
2013 Niall Cousens UBC
2012 Gagandeep Dosanjh UBC
2011 Cam Hundal Victoria
2010 Adrian Pena York
2009 Gabriel Moreau Laval
2008 Gerrard Ladiyou York
2007 Graham Smith UBC
2006 Justin Farenik Trinity Western
2005 Jon Poli UBC
2004 Sean Battistoni Victoria
2003 Mesut Mert Saint Mary's
2002 John Kamendy Brock
2001 Kenny Nutt Laurier
2000 Kenny Nutt Laurier
1999 Ryan Walker Alberta
1998 Michael Potts Western
1997 Paul English Dalhousie
1996 Maurizio Conforti Victoria
1995 Paul English Dalhousie
1994 Pat Onstad UBC
1993 Eric Puig Sherbrooke
1992 Tom Kim UBC
1991 Dana Peoples McMaster
1990 Not awarded
1989 Mike Mosher UBC
1988 Coz Zambazis Toronto
1987 Scott Sieben Victoria
1986 Alex Percy UBC

References

External links 
2006 Championship Website
2008 Season Almanac
U Sports Men's Soccer Championship

 
U Sports trophies
University and college soccer in Canada competitions